Oved (Hebrew: עובד, Oved) is a Jewish surname and given name,  a spelling variant of the biblical name Obed. Notable people with the name include:

Surname
Avi Oved, American university administrator
Gil Oved, South African entrepreneur
Margalit Oved, American-Israeli dancer and choreographer
Reuven Oved, Israeli former professional footballer
Yaacov Oved, Israeli historian

Given name
Oved Ben-Ami (1905-1988), Israeli politician

See also

Obed (name)

Hebrew-language surnames